Thet Tan Paw Ka Lu Ta Yauk is a 1980 Burmese black-and-white drama film, directed by Tekkatho Win Pe starring Win Oo, Khin Than Nu, Aung Lwin and Aye Aye Thin.

Cast
Win Oo
Khin Than Nu
Aung Lwin
Aye Aye Thin

References

1980 films
1980s Burmese-language films
Burmese drama films
Films shot in Myanmar
1980 drama films